The 1959 South American Championship held in Ecuador was an extra South American Championship for the year. The tournament was contested between five teams; Bolivia, Chile, Colombia, and Peru did not participate, whilst Brazil attended with a team from Pernambuco. Uruguay won their 10th South American title.

Format
The format was the same as other tournaments; it was a round-robin tournament, awarding two points for a win, one for a draw, and nothing for a defeat. The team with the most points at the end was declared the tournament winner.

Venues

Squads

Standings

Matches

Result

Goalscorers

With six goals, José Sanfilippo of Argentina is the top scorer in the tournament. In total, 40 goals were scored by 21 different players, with only one of them credited as own goal.

6 goals
 José Sanfilippo
4 goals
 Mario Ludovico Bergara
 Paulo Pisaneschi
3 goals
 Silvio Parodi
 Alcides Silveira
 José Sasía
2 goals

 Geraldo José da Silva
 Carlos Alberto Raffo
 Guillermo Escalada

1 goal

 Juan José Pizzuti
 Omar Higinio García
 Rubén Héctor Sosa
 Zé de Mello
 Alberto Pedro Spencer
 Climaco Cañarte
 José Vicente Balseca
 Eligio Antonio Insfrán
 Pedro Antonio Cabral
 Domingo Pérez

Own goal
 Rómulo Gómez (playing against Paraguay)

External links
 South American Championship 1959 at RSSSF

 
1959, Ecuador
International association football competitions hosted by Ecuador
1959 in South American football
1959 in Ecuadorian sport
December 1959 sports events in South America
Sports competitions in Guayaquil
20th century in Guayaquil